Aawitin Ko Na Lang is the sixth studio album by Ariel Rivera. The album was released during the Teen pop/Bubblegum pop explosion. His album proved to be successful earning him another #1 album and earned him a Gold album.

Track listing

Artist: Ariel Rivera

Reviews 
According to David Gonzales of AllMusic, the album consists mainly remakes of popular Philippine songs. He described it as "...dominated by slow, easy listening music and middle-of-the-road ballads. Rivera has one of the best voices in the Philippines -- strong, full of depth, and well-suited for crooning such pleasant, easy listening music. The only song that isn't slow, album opener "A Smile in Your Heart," is spirited and pleasant, and sounds a bit like American country music." He also characterized the songs, "The album's other 11 songs are slow and mellow, although "Init Sa Magdamag" (Heat All Night Long) has some spirit. Needless to say, Aawitin Ko Na Lang... needs more upbeat material. "I Don't Love You Anymore" is a duet featuring Ariel Rivera and Lea Salonga, a popular Philippine singer who won major international awards for her starring role in the musical Miss Saigon. Salonga has a predilection toward easy listening love songs with simple melodies and, predictably, "I Don't Love You Anymore" fits that description exactly. "When I Met You" benefits from an enchanting pennywhistle played by Tots Tolentino, who also plays exciting saxophone lines on "Tuyo Na'ng Damdamin" (A Dry Feeling) and "Kahit Na Magtiis" (Even If Suffers). Popular Philippine singer Sharon Cuneta joins Rivera on the love song "Ikaw" (You). The blending of Rivera and backing female singers on "Don't Say Goodbye" is impressive. Despite the obvious talents present, Aawitin Ko Na Lang... suffers from having too many slow songs, a number of which are nondescript."

References

1999 albums
Ariel Rivera albums